The Arab states of the Persian Gulf refers to a group of Arab states which border the Persian Gulf. There are seven member states of the Arab League in the region: Bahrain, Kuwait, Iraq, Oman, Qatar, Saudi Arabia, and the United Arab Emirates. Yemen is bound to the six countries of the Gulf Cooperation Council, based on history and culture.

The term has been used in different contexts to refer to a number of Arab states in the Persian Gulf region. The prominent regional political union Gulf Cooperation Council includes Bahrain, Kuwait, Oman, Qatar, Saudi Arabia, and the United Arab Emirates. Historically, various British Empire protectorates, including the Trucial States were Arab states along the Persian Gulf.

Politics
Some of the Arab states of the Persian Gulf are constitutional monarchies with elected parliaments. Bahrain (Majlis al Watani) and Kuwait (Majlis al Ummah) have legislatures with members elected by the population.

The Sultanate of Oman also has an advisory council (Majlis ash-Shura) that is popularly elected. In the United Arab Emirates, a federation of seven monarchical emirates, the Federal National Council, functions only as an advisory body, but some of its members are now chosen via a limited electoral college nominated by the seven rulers.

The Kingdom of Saudi Arabia remains a hereditary monarchy with limited political representation. In Qatar, an elected national parliament has been mooted and is written into the new constitution, but elections are yet to be held. Saudi Arabia and Qatar are the two Arab states and absolute monarchies to have never held elections since their respective establishments as nations in 1932 and 1971. Iraq is the only federal republic situated in the Persian Gulf region.

Freedom of the press 
Mass media in the seven Arab states of the Persian Gulf have varying degrees of freedom, with Kuwait topping the league with a lively press that enjoys considerably more freedom than its Persian Gulf counterparts according to Freedom House and Reporters Without Borders. Both organizations rank Kuwait's press as the freest of all Arab states of the Persian Gulf. Kuwait ranks amongst the top three for free press in the Arab world. Qatar and Oman come in second and third respectively within the regional ranks of the Arab states of the Persian Gulf.

Peace 
The seven Arab states of the Persian Gulf lie in a volatile region and their seven governments, with varying degrees of success and effort, try and advance peace in their own countries and other countries. However, Arab countries in the Persian Gulf region—specifically Saudi Arabia and Qatar—stand accused of funding militant Islamist organizations, such as Hamas and the Muslim Brotherhood. According to the Institute for Economics and Peace (IEP)'s Global Peace Index of 2016, the six governments had varying degrees of success in maintaining peace amongst their respective borders with Qatar ranked number 1 amongst its regional peers as the most peaceful regional and Middle Eastern nation (and ranked 34 worldwide), while Kuwait ranks second both in the Persian Gulf and Middle East regions (and 51 worldwide), followed by the UAE in the third spot (61 worldwide).

Economy 
Most of these Arab states have significant revenues from petroleum. The United Arab Emirates has been successfully diversifying its economy. 79% of UAE's total GDP comes from non-oil sectors. Oil accounts for only 2% of Dubai's GDP. Bahrain has the Persian Gulf's first "post-oil" economy because the Bahraini economy does not rely on oil.

Since the late 20th century, Bahrain has heavily invested in the banking and tourism sectors.  The country's capital, Manama, is home to many large financial structures. The UAE and Bahrain have a high Human Development Index (ranking 31 and 42 worldwide respectively in 2019) and was recognised by the World Bank as high income economies. According to the World Bank, most of these Arab states have been the world's most generous donors of aid as a share of GDP.

See also 
 Arab Cold War
 Gulf War
 Iran–Iraq War
 Iran–Saudi Arabia proxy conflict
 Iraqi–Kurdish conflict
 Qatar–Saudi Arabia diplomatic conflict
 Arab Revolt
 Collapse and partition of the Ottoman Empire
 Iran–Turkey border
 Iraq–Turkey border
 Arabian Peninsula
 Eastern Arabia
 Gulf Arabic
 History of Arabia
 Pre-Islamic Arabia
 Religion in pre-Islamic Arabia
 Tribes of Arabia
 Territorial disputes in the Persian Gulf

References

Further reading 

Arab League
Arabian Peninsula
Persian Gulf